Plasmodium tomodoni is a parasite of the genus Plasmodium. As in all Plasmodium species, P. tomodoni has both vertebrate and insect hosts. The vertebrate hosts for this parasite are reptiles.

Taxonomy 
The parasite was first described by Pessoa and Fleury in 1968.

Distribution 
This species is found in Brazil.

Hosts 
This species infects snakes. The other two species infecting snakes are Plasmodium pessoai and Plasmodium wenyoni.

The original host this species was described from was a Tomodon dorsatus from Brazil.

References 

tomodoni